The Girard Point Bridge is a double-decked cantilevered truss bridge carrying Interstate 95 across the Schuylkill River in the American city of Philadelphia, Pennsylvania.  The bridge was opened in 1973. It is the last crossing of the Schuylkill River, which empties into the Delaware River less than half a mile downstream. It has an has an average of 148,500 vehicles per day, including 6% truck traffic.

History

 A bridge similar to this appears in Need for Speed: Most Wanted , except it is designed to resemble the Tobin Bridge in Boston and the San Francisco–Oakland Bay Bridge's old cantilever span.

Construction and renovation in 2010 and 2011

The Pennsylvania Department of Transportation selected Buckley and Co. as the main contractor and a joint venture between Alpha-Liberty Painting as the paint contractor.  The bridge deck was milled and a new surface was poured and the structural steel was painted in order to extend the life of the steel.  Work finished in the fall of 2011, but restarted in 2012 for expansion-joint replacement.

See also

 List of crossings of the Delaware River
 List of crossings of the Schuylkill River
 Transportation in Pennsylvania

References

1973 establishments in Pennsylvania
Bridges completed in 1973
Bridges in Philadelphia
Bridges on the Interstate Highway System
Bridges over the Schuylkill River
Interstate 95
Road bridges in Pennsylvania
South Philadelphia
Southwest Philadelphia
Steel bridges in the United States
Cantilever bridges in the United States